Ultraviolet is the fifth studio album by Australian band Pseudo Echo. It's the group's first studio album in 14 years.

Background 
In 2012, Pseudo Echo gathered for shows to celebrate the 30th anniversary of the release of their first single "Listening". The band agreed to record a new album. To fund recording, singer Brian Canham approached PledgeMusic to use fan-power to finance the album's recording and manufacturing. The Pseudo Echo campaign turned out to be one of the most successful take-ups for Pledgemusic generating 126% of the financial goal and guaranteeing the release of the album.

Canham said "We have been fortunate enough to have had massive support from our fans through the Pledge crowd funding. This has enabled me to be completely immersed in the writing and producing of this new album. I have reflected upon many of my life experiences over the last decade with the lyric content, and hope people will relate and connect with us."

Reception 
Arne Sjostedt from Sydney Morning Herald gave the album 4 1/2 of out 5 saying; "Opening with three absolute pumpers, Pseudo Echo make a bold statement of intent. This album is out to impress. And to that end, it meets its goal. The tracks on here are strong. The synth sounds, some cut and paste from Echo's heyday (with a dose of high tech steroids), cascade through each track. It is designed to keep Echo fans happy. But as an at-times forward thinking, at others reflective piece from a band that has lived through massive popularity and come out the other side, this album provides a lot to enjoy. And dance to."

Track listing 
All tracks written by Brian Canham, except track 9, written by Canham and Ben Grayson.

 "Amazing Sound" – 4:55
 "The Desert" – 5:04
 "Things You Like" – 5:33
 "Fathers Arms" – 4:51
 "Ultraviolet" – 3:53
 "Lonely" – 4:55
 "Loosen the Rope" – 2:24
 "Fighting the Tide" – 3:53
 "Suddenly Silently" – 4:02
 "Architecturally Sound" – 5:14

Personnel 
 Brian Canham – lead vocals, guitar, keyboards, bass guitar, synth bass
 Simon Rayner – backing vocals, keyboards, synth bass
 Darren Danielson – drums
 Ben Grayson – keyboards

References 

Pseudo Echo albums
2014 albums
Self-released albums